Klinge (Lower Sorbian: Klinka) is a village in the Lower Lusatia region, east of the city of Cottbus in Brandenburg. It is part of the municipality of Wiesengrund.

Transport 
The Bahnhof Klinge is served once an hour in each direction by the RB46 train travelling between Cottbus and Forst.

References

External links
 A train at Bahnhof Klinge

Villages in Brandenburg
Populated places in Spree-Neiße